On 9 March 2016, True Aviation Flight 21, an Antonov An-26 transport aircraft operated by True Aviation crashed 500 metres from Cox's Bazar Airport in Bangladesh, from where it had taken off shortly before. The twin-engine plane was attempting to return to the airport after experiencing an engine failure. Three of the four crew members on board were killed in the accident.

Background
The flight was managed by Sky Blue Aviation. The member of Parliament from Cox's Bazar and member of Awami League Ashek Ullah Rafique is one of the owners of the aviation company.

History
An Antonov An-26 cargo aircraft, operated by True Aviation as Flight 21, crashed in the Bay of Bengal, five minutes after takeoff from Cox's Bazar Airport, Bangladesh, on 9 March 2016. The aircraft was transporting a cargo of shrimp to Jessore when one of the engines failed shortly after takeoff. The airplane impacted the water at 9:05, as it attempted to return to the airport. Local fishermen first spotted the debris and alerted authorities.

Crew
All four of the crew members aboard were Ukrainian nationals; three died and one survivor was critically injured. The aircraft was owned by Air Urga and was on lease to True Aviation. The dead were flight engineer Kulisn Andriy, pilot Murad Gafarov and co-pilot Ivan Patrov. The flight navigator Vlodymyr Kultanov was in critical condition. He was taken to Cox's Bazar Sadar Hospital, along with another initial survivor who later died.

Rescue
Bangladesh Navy, Coast Guard and fire service took part in the rescue.

References

True Aviation An-26 crash
Aviation accidents and incidents in 2016
Aviation accidents and incidents in Bangladesh
History of Chittagong Division
Accidents and incidents involving the Antonov An-26
March 2016 events in Bangladesh
2016 disasters in Bangladesh